Asioryctitheria ("Asian digging beasts") is an extinct order of early eutherians.

Skull structure
With the exception of Prokennalestes, these advanced forms lacked a Meckelian groove.  Furthermore, they were equipped with double-rooted canines, a lower premolar with a reduced or absent metaconid and a more elongated lower premolar than their predecessors.  In addition, the entoconid and hypoconulid on the lower molars are untwinned, the entotympanic is non-existent, the alisphenoid is enlarged, a Vidian foramen is present as well as a promontorium linked to the paroccipital process via the crista interfenestralis.

Classification
Asioryctitheria contains at least four genera and two families.
 Sasayamamylos kawaii Kusuhashi et al. 2013
 Kennalestidae Kielan-Jaworowska 1981
 Kennalestes gobiensis Kielan-Jaworowska 1981
 Asioryctidae Szalay 1977
 Asioryctes nemegetensis Kielan-Jaworowska 1975
 Ukhaatherium nesovi Novacek et al. 1997

References

Further reading
Zofia Kielan-Jaworowska, Richard L. Cifelli, and Zhe-Xi Luo, Mammals from the Age of Dinosaurs: Origins, Evolution, and Structure (New York: Columbia University Press, 2004), 499–501.

External links
MESOZOIC MAMMALS; Basal Eutheria Two, an internet directory
A eutherian mammal from the Early Cretaceous of Russia at Ingenta

Prehistoric eutherians
Early Cretaceous genus first appearances
Late Cretaceous genus extinctions
Early Cretaceous mammals of Asia
Late Cretaceous mammals of Asia
Fossil taxa described in 1997
Prehistoric animal orders